TimeShift is a first-person shooter developed by Saber Interactive and published by Vivendi Games for Microsoft Windows, Xbox 360, and PlayStation 3. It was developed using the Saber3D Engine. The game was released on Xbox 360 and Windows on October 30, 2007 in North America; November 1, 2007 in Australia; and November 2, 2007 in Europe.

Plot
Scientists from the near future have begun work on creating a viable time machine. The project results in the creation of two devices, the Alpha Suit, a prototype jumpsuit, and the Beta Suit, a more advanced, military-grade model with features the Alpha Suit lacks such as combat-related timeshifting abilities and an integrated artificial intelligence named Strategic Systems for Adaptable Metacognition (or S.S.A.M.) to prevent the creation of temporal paradoxes.

The director of the project, Dr. Aiden Krone, takes the Alpha Suit and travels into the past. Once there he alters the timeline, placing himself as the ruler of the Krone Magistrate that controls a dystopic world.

The protagonist, an unnamed fellow scientist (originally intended to be called Michael Swift), takes the Beta Suit and follows Dr. Krone back to the year 1939 in an alternate timestream to a place called Alpha District. During the transport, parts of the Beta suit are damaged (an "auto-return" which allows for a "checkpoint" system, and the ability to revert to the original timeline) forcing the protagonist to assist the Occupant Rebellion against Dr. Krone in hopes of salvaging parts from the Alpha suit.

The protagonist fights alongside the Occupants in Alpha District, saving many of their members and supporting their raids. He meets Commander Cooke, leader of the Occupants, and is tasked with rescuing Delta Battalion, an Occupant unit that was presumed dead some time ago. After freeing Delta Battalion from a prison, the protagonist later heads to Krone's munitions plant and destroys it. The protagonist meets up with Commander Cooke, who informs him that his efforts have left Krone's military in complete disarray due to a lack of resources and supplies, and that Krone himself is retreating to Alpha District. The Occupants raid a Zeppelin factory and steal a Zeppelin to pursue the rogue scientist.

The protagonist returns to Alpha District in an altered version of when he first arrived, only things are going in favor of the Occupants. He is confronted by Krone in a giant war machine named the Sentinel, which nearly destroys the Occupant Rebellion, but he succeeds in destroying the Sentinel. As an incapacitated Krone emerges from the wreckage, the protagonist kills him and retrieves the part required to repair the Beta suit. He is thanked by Commander Cooke and returns to the original timeline to save his girlfriend, Dr. Marissa Foster, who had been killed by the explosion Krone had caused. He shuts down the bomb and walks up to Foster, who begins to wake up. She reaches out to him although not sure of who he is. As he begins to remove his mask the computer in the suit warns that a paradox is imminent and transports him away.

Gameplay 
The key feature of TimeShift is the player's ability to control time: slowing, stopping or even rewinding time more or less at will. This allows a player to stop time to dodge an incoming projectile or steal an enemy's weapon. Specific time-related puzzles also require these abilities. The player's abilities also affect the color of their environment in such that slowing time produces a blueshift, rewinding it produces a yellow haze, and stopping time creates a white filter "haze". The player must use them wisely to make its way through the game. In some parts of the game the time powers are lengthened.

Development 
The game was originally going to be published by Atari, but publishing rights switched to Sierra on April 20, 2006. On August 31, 2006, TimeShift was delayed for a second time.

Because the game had been delayed several times and was not mentioned very much in gaming news, the press thought that the project had been abandoned - later attributed to a highly negative reception of the 2006 demos. However, on April 10, 2007, Vivendi Games announced that they were giving TimeShift a complete overhaul and were fixing many bugs.

One of a number of changes is that Michael Swift, the game's original protagonist, does not appear in the game. After the retooling of the game, Saber introduced "the suit" as the time control device, making the protagonist anonymous. Saber said that this change was to let the player imagine that "you are the protagonist".

Initially, TimeShift was announced for Windows and Xbox 360, but at the 2007 SCEA Gamer's Day, it was announced that the game would also be appearing on the PlayStation 3. All iterations of the revamped game came out on time or early, on all platforms, world-wide in holiday 2007.

Demo 
A playable version of the original concept was released online for PC and in the May 2006 issue of Official Xbox Magazine for the Xbox 360.

A single-player demo of the revamped game for Windows was released on October 11, 2007. The demo contains one level and four weapons from the full game. An Xbox 360 demo was also released on Xbox Live. A demo for the PlayStation 3 was released on November 1, 2007.

On November 9, 2007, IGN announced a multiplayer demo scheduled to be released on November 14, 2007 on Xbox Live Marketplace. It has been released. The multiplayer demo for PlayStation 3 was released on December 6, 2007. Both of these demos and the single player were combined at that time. Thus the demo runs in both single and multiplayer.

Reception 
TimeShift has received mixed to positive reviews. The PC version received 71/100 on Metacritic and 72.20% on GameRankings.

Both the Xbox 360 and PS3 versions scored 70/100 on Metacritic and grades of 70.63% and 70.19% on GameRankings.

Critics found the gameplay derivative of other titles released before and close to Timeshift and found the plot underwhelming. However, the core gameplay and mechanics were praised for their polish.

Notes

References

External links 
 TimeShift at GameRankings
 Interview with Matthew Karch (CEO at Saber Interactive) on April 14, 2008

2007 video games
Alternate history video games
Video games about artificial intelligence
Dieselpunk video games
First-person shooters
Multiplayer and single-player video games
Video games about multiple time paths
PlayStation 3 games
Science fiction video games
Sierra Entertainment games
Saber Interactive games
Video games about time travel
Video games set in 1939
Video games with time manipulation
Windows games
Xbox 360 games
Video games using Havok
Video games developed in the United States